Porsche-Arena is a multi-purpose arena, located in Stuttgart, Germany. The seating capacity of the arena varies, from 5,100 to 8,000 people and it was opened in 2006, after 14 months of construction. The arena is part of a sport complex located in Stuttgart's NeckarPark, situated between the Scharrena Stuttgart, Mercedes-Benz Arena and Hanns Martin Schleyer Halle.

To fund the construction, costs had already been pre-construction sales of the name rights planned. Dr. Ing h.c. F. Porsche AG bought the name rights, for a ten million euro, for a term of 20 years.

It is the venue for the Porsche Tennis Grand Prix, a WTA Tour event and also hosted some matches at the 2007 World Men's Handball Championship. 	

Anton Hunger: "The tournament is now at home in Stuttgart. We knew we’d make mistakes at the first edition. But we didn’t promise too much last year and have eliminated almost all the mistakes in 2007. A total of more than 36,000 spectators were in the arena. The number was up on the previous year even though seating was slightly reduced to improve comfort."

Gallery

See also
 List of tennis stadiums by capacity

References

External links

Homepage Porsche-Arena
City of Stuttgart
Transportation Plan with, PDF
Porsche-Arena detail, PDF
Wikimapia Official site
Porsche-Arena Germany Brazil volleyball 1
Porsche-Arena Germany Brazil volleyball 2

Indoor arenas in Germany
Tennis venues in Germany
Handball venues in Germany
Sports venues in Baden-Württemberg
Gymnastics venues